Iris: The Movie is a 2010 South Korean spy action film.

As part of the first Korean production that shot a television drama and feature-length film simultaneously (Kim Kyu-tae was in charge of the TV segments, and Yang Yun-ho in charge of the film segments), the TV series Iris was a hit when it aired on KBS2 in 2009, with ratings of 30%. Iris: The Movie is a feature-length edit of the 20 episodes, along with additional footage shot specifically for the theatrical version and a different ending.

Iris: The Movie premiered at the 34th Hong Kong International Film Festival on March 21, 2010.

It did not receive a theatrical run in South Korea, but was instead released on November 22, 2010, through IPTV, cable TV, satellite PPV, and Cine21 online portals.

Due to Lee Byung-hun's Japanese fanbase, distributor Kadokawa Pictures released the film theatrically in Japan on January 8, 2011, under the alternate title Iris - The Last.

Plot

The Korean peninsula is constantly under political and military tension, especially with the North Korean nuclear issue. To avoid a second Korean War, a secret black ops agency known as the National Security Service (NSS) protects South Korea's national security by training special agents who would use any means to fulfill their mission. They officially do not exist and are not acknowledged or protected by the government. Although they are trained to be cold-blooded killers, there is one taboo they cannot avoid: love. Hyun-jun and Sa-woo were close friends and rivals in the 707th Special Mission Battalion, and both are recruited into the NSS and quickly become the best of the best. Each with different secret assignments, they soon take different paths in life. In a world of conspiracy and betrayal, they both fall for Seung-hee, the beautiful but lethal profiling specialist at NSS. Kim Hyun-ju's mission is to dismantle IRIS and prevent a nuclear attack on Seoul.

Cast
Lee Byung-hun ... Kim Hyun-jun
Kim Tae-hee ... Choi Seung-hee
Jung Joon-ho ... Jin Sa-woo
Kim So-yeon ... Kim Seon-hwa 
Kim Seung-woo ... Park Chun-young
Choi Seung-hyun ... Vick
Kim Yeong-cheol ... Baek San

References

External links
 
 

South Korean spy action films
2010 films
Films about North Korea–South Korea relations
2010s South Korean films